WQSI (93.9 FM, "FM Talk 93.9") is an American radio station broadcasting a news/talk format. Licensed to Union Springs, Alabama, the station serves the Auburn, Alabama, area. The station is currently owned by Tiger Communications, Inc.

On May 4, 2020, WQSI and its talk format moved to 93.9 FM Union Springs, swapping frequencies with alternative rock-formatted WTGZ.

Programming
Syndicated music programming once included America's Grand Ole Opry Weekend from Westwood One. Auburn didn't really take to the classic country format, and in the summer of 2014 the music gave way to a conservative news/talk format. (Taken from Alabama Broadcast Media Page)  Now as a talk station notable programs include Don Imus in the Morning, The Paul Finebaum Show, The Savage Nation with Dr Michael Savage and Coast to Coast AM with George Noory.

Ownership
In November 2005, Tiger Communications Inc. (Thomas Hayley, president) reached an agreement to acquire WBIL and WQSI from H&H Communications LLC (Fred R. Hughey, member) for a reported combined sale price of $350,000. The FCC approved the deal on February 13, 2006, and the transaction was consummated on April 6, 2006.

Awards and honors
As a country music formatted station, WQSI on-air personality Pat Julian was nominated for a Country Music Association Award as "Small Market Broadcast Personality of the Year" in 1983.

References

External links
FM talk 93.9 Twitter

QSI
1977 establishments in Alabama
Radio stations established in 1977